The Yonggu Mausoleum is the mausoleum of Empress Feng (442-490), formally Empress Wenming and the wife of Emperor Wencheng of the Northern Wei dynasty of Chinese history. The tomb is located on a mountain about 25 kilometers from the city of Datong, in Shanxi Province. When her husband died in 465, Empress Dowager Wenming became regent until her stepson, Emperor Xiaowen, attained his adulthood. While Emperor Xiaowen assumed  the imperial powers upon adulthood, she remained highly influential until her death in 490. This was at the time Buddhism became a state religion and Empress Dowager Wenming was responsible for  the imperial shrines at Yungang Grottoes. There is evidence that The Empress Dowager Wenming masterminded the transformation of the government and the sinification movement.

When the Empress died she was buried with extraordinary honors. Emperor Xiaowen was distraught and could not eat or drink for five days.

The tomb
Northern Wei  tombs and shrines were of considerable architectural importance and the Empress's tomb was built during a period of striking tomb and shrine building. The construction of her tomb had begun in 484 on Mount Fang (Fangshan, the modern name is Liangshan, i.e., Mount Liang). It sits on hilly ground along with other royal tombs. It was excavated in 1976 and has been the subject of scholarly research.

The double-chambered royal tomb, with its distinctive architecture, is dug into the side of a hill. It was created in the period before the capital of the Northern Wei moved to Luoyang. Over her bricked tomb was built a huge mound almost 33 metres high with a square base. Leading down from the mound was a diagonal ramp leading into an antechamber, then through a connective passageway to a large burial chamber. The total length of the interior was almost 18 metres, larger than any tomb in the area and one of the largest tombs of the Wei  excavated so far. The walls were covered with relief sculptures. As mentioned, this royal tomb has two chambers, the first an anteroom to which the bricked pathway led. Single chamber tombs were more common for nonroyal burials.

The anteroom had  a simple barrel vault roof. However, the roof of the burial chamber in the back had a coffer ceiling that, although vaulted, had a flat wooden beamed  top. A stone Hall of Eternal Resoluteness was built 600 metres to the south of the tomb with a walkway lined with stelae with  inscriptions  of funerary text and lined with sculptures of animals. A wall enclosed the  whole funerary area with the entrance marked by free standing gate towers (que). The tomb is oriented on a north-south axis with the tomb's entrance on the south.

References

External links
Ethnic Emperor and Advocate of Sinicization
A Note on Chapter 59 of the Wen-Ming Hsiao-Shih (A Brief History of Enlightenment

Northern Wei
Major National Historical and Cultural Sites in Shanxi
Burial sites of imperial Chinese families
Archaeological sites in China
Chinese architectural history
Datong